Three ships of the United States Navy have been named USS Wichita, after the city of Wichita, Kansas.

  was a heavy cruiser in service from in 1939 to 1947 and active during World War II.
  was a replenishment oiler in service from 1969 to 1993.
  is a  launched in 2016.

United States Navy ship names